José Luis Deus Rodríguez (born 12 January 1977) is a Spanish retired footballer who played as a striker.

He played 140 Segunda División matches over five seasons, scoring a total of 18 goals for Hércules, Gimnàstic, Xerez and Salamanca. In La Liga, he appeared for Deportivo de La Coruña.

Club career
Born in Lausanne, Switzerland to Spanish immigrants, Deus started his career with Deportivo de La Coruña, being mainly associated to the reserve side during his tenure. His La Liga input with the first team consisted of 12 scoreless appearances, the first coming on 8 September 1996 in a 1–1 away draw against RC Celta de Vigo where he played 23 minutes.

In the summer of 1998, Deus signed with Segunda División club Hércules CF, featuring regularly but being relegated. He won a promotion the following season with Racing de Ferrol, from Segunda División B.

Still owned by Deportivo, Deus then joined S.C. Braga of the Portuguese Primeira Liga. After leaving the Estadio Riazor he spent four consecutive seasons in the Spanish second division, being relegated with Gimnàstic de Tarragona and UD Salamanca; in 2006, he helped the latter team be immediately promoted.

Deus continue to compete in the third tier in the following years, with Terrassa FC and Racing Ferrol. Until his retirement in 2012 at the age of 35, he played in amateur football in Galicia.

Deus then worked with Xerez CD as a youth coach. In June 2013, he joined Gimnàstic as a youth coordinator, leaving five years later for CD Lugo where he also acted as assistant to newly appointed director of football Emilio Viqueira, his former Deportivo teammate; on 5 February 2019, the pair was fired.

International career
Deus played once for Spain at under-21 level. On 4 September 1998, he started in the 3–1 victory in Cyprus for the 2000 UEFA European Championship qualification campaign.

On 29 December 2005, Deus scored twice in Galicia's 3–2 friendly win over Uruguay in Santiago de Compostela. It was the region's first official match since 1930.

References

External links

Racing de Ferrol profile 

1977 births
Living people
Swiss people of Spanish descent
Sportspeople from Lausanne
Spanish footballers
Association football forwards
La Liga players
Segunda División players
Segunda División B players
Tercera División players
Deportivo Fabril players
Deportivo de La Coruña players
Hércules CF players
Racing de Ferrol footballers
Gimnàstic de Tarragona footballers
Xerez CD footballers
UD Salamanca players
Terrassa FC footballers
Bergantiños FC players
Atlético Sanluqueño CF players
Primeira Liga players
S.C. Braga players
Spain youth international footballers
Spain under-21 international footballers
Spanish expatriate footballers
Expatriate footballers in Portugal
Spanish expatriate sportspeople in Portugal